Kevin Eldon Will See You Now is a British comedy show broadcast on BBC Radio 4, currently in its fourth series. It is made by Pozzitive Television, and all 4 series have been produced and directed by David Tyler. It is written by and stars the comedian Kevin Eldon.

Over the course of the four series, there have been a number of famous guest stars making appearances, including Paul Putner, Julia Davis, Justin Edwards, Amelia Bullmore, Morwenna Banks, and Miles Jupp.

Episode list

Critical reception  
Kevin Eldon Will See You Now received an overwhelmingly positive reception when it was first broadcast on BBC Radio 4, and has been nominated for a number of awards. The show made the shortlist for the British Comedy Guide Awards for Best Radio Sketch Show in 2017, and again in 2020. Series 3 was also shortlisted for the 2018 Writers Guild Award for Best Radio Comedy, and Series 4 was also shortlisted for both the Radio Award at the Chortle Awards, and the award for Best Scripted Comedy Show at the BBC's Audio Drama Awards. Writing in The Big Issue in 2019, Robin Ince described Kevin Eldon as "a titan of British comedy whose innovative new radio show is giving him the platform his unique talent deserves", while Brian Donaldson, writing for 'The List'', gave Kevin Eldon Will See You Now 4 stars, calling the show "addictive listening".

Notable awards and nominations  
 British Comedy Guide Awards - Best Radio Sketch Show - Shortlisted (2017) 
 Writers Guild Award - Best Radio Comedy - Shortlisted (2018) 
 British Comedy Guide Awards - Best Radio Sketch Show - Shortlisted (2020)
 BBC Audio Drama Awards - Best Scripted Comedy Show - Shortlisted (2020)

References 

BBC Radio comedy programmes
2012 radio programme debuts